Leslie Walker may refer to:

 Leslie Walker (bishop), bishop of Mpumalanga, South Africa
 Leslie Walker (author), American author, journalist and college professor